Edgar Chadwick (March 1891 – January quarter 1963) was an English professional footballer who played as an inside forward. He played in the Football League for Nelson.

References

1891 births
1963 deaths
Footballers from Blackburn
English footballers
English football managers
Association football inside forwards
Blackburn Rovers F.C. players
Nelson F.C. players
Accrington Stanley F.C. (1891) players
Great Harwood F.C. players
Bacup Borough F.C. players
Lancaster City F.C. players
Clitheroe F.C. players
Morecambe F.C. players
Nelson F.C. managers
English Football League players